Sarvann is a 2017 Indian Punjabi language thriller film directed by Karan Guliani, written by Amberdeep Singh and produced by Priyanka Chopra Jonas under her production company Purple Pebble Pictures. It stars Amrinder Gill, Simi Chahal & Ranjit Bawa as the main protagonists of the film and was released worldwide on 13 January 2017. It is an action, drama film about an NRI boy Mithu (Amrinder Gill), coming to India to connect to his true roots.

Cast
Amrinder Gill as Mithu
Simi Chahal as Paali
Ranjit Bawa as Amreek
Sardar Sohi as DSP
Amberdeep Singh as Taxi driver  
Gurmeet Saajan as Paali's father
Seema Kaushal as Paali's mother
Anita Meet as Sarvann's mother
 Rubina as Angel's Mother
Dilnoor Kaur as Angel
 Jasmeen Johal as Mithu's sister
 Navdeep Dhillon as Peter
 Don McLeod as Cop
 Cameron McDonald as Cop #3

Track list

References

External links 
Sarvann trailer
Sarvann Jukebox
 

2017 films
Punjabi-language Indian films
2010s Punjabi-language films
Films scored by Jatinder Shah